White House is a NJ Transit railroad station on the Raritan Valley Line, in the Whitehouse Station section of Readington in Hunterdon County, New Jersey. The station is on the west side of Main Street in the center and the station building has subsequently been turned into a branch library for the Hunterdon County Library system.  This station has no weekend service.

The building was designed for the Central Railroad of New Jersey in the Richardson Romanesque style by Bradford Gilbert who is best known for having designed the first steel-framed curtain wall building, but who also designed at least six railroad stations. It was added to the National Register of Historic Places in 1984 for its significance in architecture and part in the Operating Passenger Railroad Stations Thematic Resource.

Station layout
The station has a single low-level asphalt side platform.

See also
National Register of Historic Places listings in Hunterdon County, New Jersey
Operating Passenger Railroad Stations Thematic Resource (New Jersey)

Bibliography

References

External links
 
 http://bradfordleegilbert.com/slides/Whitehouse_index.html

world.nycsubway.org - NJT Raritan Line
 Station and Station House from Main Street from Google Maps Street View

NJ Transit Rail Operations stations
Railway stations in the United States opened in 1848
Railway stations on the National Register of Historic Places in New Jersey
Readington Township, New Jersey
Former Central Railroad of New Jersey stations
Railway stations in Hunterdon County, New Jersey
National Register of Historic Places in Hunterdon County, New Jersey
New Jersey Register of Historic Places
1848 establishments in New Jersey